Walter Godefroot (born 2 July 1943) is a retired Belgian professional road bicycle racer and former directeur sportif of , later known as T-Mobile Team.

As amateur cyclist, he won the bronze medal in the individual road race of the 1964 Summer Olympics after his young compatriot Eddy Merckx was caught in the final. Both men turned professional in 1965 and Walter Godefroot was presented as Merckx's bane in his early days, winning several races ahead of him: the Belgian championship in 1965, Liège–Bastogne–Liège (1967) and Paris–Roubaix (1969).

But Godefroot eventually didn't have Merckx's abilities in stage races and concentrated on the separate stages in the grand tours. He won ten stages in the Tour de France, including the stage on the Champs-Élysées in 1975 where the Tour finished for the first time, and the green jersey in the 1970 Tour de France, one stage in the 1970 Tour of Italy and two stages in the 1971 Tour of Spain.

Being a specialist in one-day classic cycle races, he won another Belgian champion title in 1972, two Tours of Flanders at ten-year intervals in 1968 and 1978, two Bordeaux–Paris in 1969 and 1976 and had numerous runner-ups in other classics.

Remarkably, Godefroot informed the Tour de Flandres organization about the existence of the Koppenberg. From 1976, the hill was included in the course of the race.

At the end of his career, following the classics campaign in April 1977, he tested positive for a doping product along with several other top riders.

In 1981, Godefroot and his wife started a cycling shop in Deurle which still exists today.

He managed the Capri-Sonne-Koga Miyata, T-Mobile and Astana teams. He was notably the sports director of Bjarne Riis, Jan Ullrich and Erik Zabel during the victorious Tour de France editions in 1996 and 1997, although Riis and Zabel later admitted they used EPO in the 1996 Tour de France.

Godefroot stepped down as team manager before the 2006 season and was replaced by Olaf Ludwig. His contract was not renewed when it ran out in July 2007. He then withdrew from professional cycling.

In his racing days he was called 'The Bulldog of Flanders'.

Major results 

1964
 Olympic Games
3rd  Men's individual road race
 1st Gent-Staden
 3rd Tour de Tunisie
 1st Stages 1, 4, 8
Tour de Berlin
 1st Stage 2
1965
 1st  Road race, National Road Championships
 1st Omloop van het Zuidwesten
Tour du Nord
 1st Stage 3 (TTT)
 1st Critérium de Libramont
 3rd Tielt–Antwerpen–Tielt
1966
 Volta a Catalunya
 1st Stages 1, 2, 4, 7, 10
 Grand Prix du Midi Libre
 1st Stage 1
1st GP Ninove
 1st Dwars door België
 Tour of Belgium
 1st Stage 3
Four Days of Dunkirk
 1st Points Classification
 1st Maaslandse Pijl
 1st Six Days of Madrid (with Emiel Severeyns)
 2nd Omloop Het Volk
 2nd Rund um den Henninger Turm
 2nd Brussels–Meulebeke
 2nd Elfstedenronde
 2nd Grand Prix d'Isbergues
1967
 Tour de France
 1st Stage 1
 Tour de Suisse
 1st Stage 7
 Tour de Romandie
 1st Stage 1
 1st Liège–Bastogne–Liège
 1st Porto–Lisboa
 1st Nokere Koerse
 1st Circuit de l'Armorique à Ploudalmézeau 
 1st Circuit du Maasland
 1st Maaslandse Pijl
 1st Berlare
 2nd Gullegem Koerse
 2nd Brussels–Meulebeke
 2nd Omloop van de Vlasstreek
1968
 Tour de France
 1st Stages 3b and 9
 2nd, Points Classification
 1st Tour of Flanders
 1st Gent–Wevelgem
 1st Dwars door België
 Paris–Nice
 1st Stages 2 and 6
 Vuelta a Andalucía
 1st Stages 3 and 8
 Tour de Suisse
 1st Stage 2
 2nd Paris–Tours
 2nd Liège–Bastogne–Liège
 3rd Paris–Roubaix
 3rd Omloop van de Vlasstreek
 3rd Super Prestige Pernod
1969
 1st Bordeaux–Paris
 1st Paris–Roubaix
 1st Scheldeprijs
 1st Critérium des As
 1st Grand Prix of Aargau Canton
 Critérium du Dauphiné Libéré
 1st Stage 6b
 1st Tour de Wallonie
 1st GP d'Argovie
 1st Omloop van de Fruitstreek
 1st Heusden Koers
 2nd  National Road Race Championships
 2nd Köln-Aachen-Köln
 2nd GP Flandria
 3rd GP Union Dortmund
1970
 Tour de France
  Winner points classification
 1st Stages 4 and 5a
 Giro d'Italia
 1st Stage 8 
 1st Züri-Metzgete
 1st Boucles de l'Aulne
 1st Giro della Provincia di Reggio Calabria
 1st Grand Prix d'Aix-en-Provence
 1st Critérium de Boulogne-sur-Mer
 2nd Tour of Flanders
 2nd overall Tour of Belgium
 1st Stage 3a
 3rd Gent–Wevelgem
1971
 Tour de France
 1st Stages 5a and 9
 Vuelta a España
 1st Stages 7 and 8
 3rd Points Classification
 Setmana Catalana de Ciclisme
 1st Stage 1
 1st Textielprijs Vichte
 2nd Leeuwse Pijl
 2nd Grand Prix de Wallonie
 3rd Six Days of Antwerp
1972
 1st  Road race, National Road Championships
 Tour de France
 1st Stage 5a
 1st G.P d'Aalst
 2nd Boucles de l'Aulne
 3rd Nationale Sluitingsprijs
 3rd Championship of Flanders
 3rd Critérium des As
 3rd Six Days of Ghent (with Graeme Gilmore)
1973
 Tour de France
 1st Stages 5 and 16a
 Paris–Nice
 1st Stage 4a
 Tour of Belgium
 1st Stage 1
 Vuelta a Andalucía
 1st Stage 6
 1st Omloop der drie Provinciën
 1st Omloop van Oost-Vlaanderen
 1st GP Impanis-Van Petegem
 1st GP Desselgem
 1st Circuit du Brabant Central
 2nd Paris–Roubaix
 2nd Flèche Halloise
 3rd Liège–Bastogne–Liège
 3rd Bordeaux–Paris
 3rd Grand Prix de Wallonie
National Track Championships
2nd  Madison (with Norbert Seeuws)
 3rd Six Days of Antwerp
1974
 1st Rund um den Henninger Turm
 1st Züri-Metzgete
 1st  Four Days of Dunkirk
 1st Stage 3a
 3rd Amstel Gold Race
 3rd Elfstedenronde
1975
1975 Tour de France
 1st Stage 22 (Champs-Élysées) – 
 1st Critérium De Panne
 2nd Omloop van de Westkust
 3rd Liège–Bastogne–Liège
 3rd Rund um den Henninger Turm
 3rd Ronde van Limburg
 3rd Grote Prijs Marcel Kint
National Track Championships
3rd  Madison (with Freddy Maertens)
1976
 1st Bordeaux–Paris
 Tour of Belgium
 1st Stage 3
 1st Omloop van Neeroeteren
Tour de Luxembourg
 1st Stage 1 (TTT
 2nd E3 Harelbeke
 2nd Circuit des Genêts Verts
 3rd Züri-Metzgete
 3rd Tour du Condroz
1977
 Four Days of Dunkirk
 1st Stage 3
 1st Hyon-Mons
 1st Heusden Koers
 2nd Tour of Flanders
 2nd Bordeaux–Paris
 2nd Milano–Torino
 3rd Züri-Metzgete
1978
 1st Tour of Flanders
 2nd GP Stad Zottegem
 2nd Grand Prix d'Aix-en-Provence
 2nd GP St. Raphael 
1979
 1st Circuit des Frontières
Tour de Belgium
 1st Stage 1 (TTT)
 1st Ruddervoorde Koerse
 2nd Boucles de l'Aulne
 2nd Omloop Mandel-Leie-Schelde
 3rd Berlare

Source

References

1943 births
Living people
Belgian male cyclists
Olympic cyclists of Belgium
Cyclists at the 1964 Summer Olympics
Olympic bronze medalists for Belgium
Belgian Tour de France stage winners
Tour de France Champs Elysées stage winners
Belgian Vuelta a España stage winners
Sportspeople from Ghent
Cyclists from East Flanders
Olympic medalists in cycling
Tour de Suisse stage winners
Medalists at the 1964 Summer Olympics